Sochlachan mac Diarmata (died 909) was 31st King of Uí Maine.

The annals record:

M865.11   Huppan, son of Cinaedh, heir presumptive of Connaught, was burned in an ignited house, by Sochlachan, son of Diarmait. 

U867.5    Abán son of Cinaed, heir designate of Connacht, was killed with fire by Sochlachán son of Diarmait.   

M908.5    Sochlachan, son of Diarmaid, lord of Ui-Maine, died in religion.

U912.5    Sochlachán son of Diarmait, king of Uí Maini, ended his life in religion.

He was pre-deceased by this son - Mughroin, son of Sochlachan, lord of Ui-Maine. And succeeded by his other son Murchadh mac Sochlachan.

References

 Annals of Ulster at CELT: Corpus of Electronic Texts at University College Cork
 Annals of Tigernach at CELT: Corpus of Electronic Texts at University College Cork
Revised edition of McCarthy's synchronisms at Trinity College Dublin.
 Byrne, Francis John (2001), Irish Kings and High-Kings, Dublin: Four Courts Press, 

People from County Galway
People from County Roscommon
10th-century Irish monarchs
Year of birth missing
909 deaths
Kings of Uí Maine